The Kōdōha or  was a political faction in the Imperial Japanese Army active in the 1920s and 1930s. The Kōdōha sought to establish a military government that promoted totalitarian, militaristic and aggressive expansionistic ideals, and was largely supported by junior officers. The radical Kōdōha rivaled the moderate Tōseiha (Control Faction) for influence in the army until the February 26 Incident in 1936, when it was de facto dissolved and many supporters were disciplined or executed.

The Kōdōha was never an organized political party and had no official standing within the Army, but its ideology and supporters continued to influence Japanese militarism into the late 1930s.

Background
The Empire of Japan had enjoyed economic growth during World War I but this ended in the early 1920s with the Shōwa financial crisis. Social unrest increased with the growing polarization of society and inequalities, such as trafficking in girls, with the labor unions increasingly influenced by socialism, communism and anarchism, but the industrial and financial leaders of Japan continued to get wealthier through their inside connections with politicians and bureaucrats. The military was considered "clean" in terms of political corruption, and elements within the army were determined to take direct action to eliminate the perceived threats to Japan created by the weaknesses of liberal democracy and political corruption.

Origins
The founders of the Kōdōha were General Sadao Araki and his protégé, Jinzaburō Masaki. Araki was a noted political philosopher within the army, who linked the ancient Japanese bushido code of the samurai with ideas similar to European fascism to form the philosophical basis of his ideology, which linked the Emperor, the people, land and morality as one and indivisible.

The Kōdōha envisioned a pure Japanese culture,  a return to the pre-westernized Japan in which the state was to be purged of corrupt bureaucrats, opportunistic politicians, and greedy zaibatsu capitalists. The state would be run directly by Emperor Hirohito in a "Shōwa Restoration" assisted by the military. Domestically, the state would return to the traditional values of Japan, and externally, war with the Soviet Union was not only unavoidable, but necessary to eliminate the perceived threat posed by communism. In a news conference in September 1932, Araki first mentioned the word "Kōdōha" ("The Imperial Way"), from which his movement received its popular name.

Araki became Minister of War in the cabinet of Prime Minister Inukai in 1931, and Masaki became Vice Chief of the Imperial Japanese Army General Staff. Both began to purge followers of their rival General Kazushige Ugaki from important posts in both the ministry and the general staff. Whereas Ugaki was pushing for a modernization of the military in terms of materials and technology, Araki and his followers argued that the spiritual training, or élan, of the Army was more important.

Opposition
Tetsuzan Nagata and Hideki Tōjō created the Tōseiha (Control Faction) group, a loose faction united mostly by their opposition to Araki and his Kōdōha.

Fundamental to both factions, however, was the common belief that national defense must be strengthened through a reform of national politics. Both factions adopted some ideas from totalitarian and fascist political philosophies, and espoused a strong skepticism of political party politics and representative democracy. However, rather than the confrontational approach of the Kōdōha, which wanted to bring about a revolution, the Tōseiha foresaw that a future war would be a total war, which would require the cooperation of the bureaucracy and the zaibatsu conglomerates to maximize Japan's industrial and military capacity. The Kōdōha was strongly supportive of the Strike North strategy of a preemptive strike against the Soviet Union, but the Tōseiha wanted a "more cautious" defense expansion by the Strike South policy.

Decline
After the Manchurian Incident, the two cliques struggled against each other for dominance over the military. The Kōdōha was initially dominant; however, after the resignation of Araki in 1934 due to ill health, the Kōdōha began to suffer a decline in its influence. Araki was replaced by General Senjūrō Hayashi, who had Tōseiha sympathies.

In November 1934, a plot by Kōdōha army officers to murder a number of important politicians was discovered before it could be implemented. The Tōseiha faction forced the resignation of Masaki from his position as Inspector General of Military Education (the third most powerful position in the Japanese Army hierarchy) for his complicity in the plot, and demoted some 3,000 other officers.

In retaliation, a Kōdōha officer, Saburō Aizawa, murdered Tōseiha leader General Tetsuzan Nagata in the Aizawa Incident. Aizawa's military tribunal was held under the jurisdiction of the First Infantry Division in Tokyo, whose commander, General Heisuke Yanagawa, was a follower of Araki. The trial thus became a vehicle by which the Kōdōha was able to denounce the Tōseiha, portray Aizawa as a selfless patriot, and Nagata as an unprincipled power-mad schemer.

At the climax of the Aizawa trial, to reduce tensions on the Tokyo area, the First Infantry Division was ordered from Tokyo to Manchuria. Instead, this caused the situation to escalate further, as the Kōdōha decided that the time was right for direct action, and backed the First Infantry Division in an attempted coup d'état on 26 February 1936 known as the February 26 Incident. The failure of the coup three days later resulted in the almost complete purge of Kōdōha members from top army positions and the resignation of their leader Sadao Araki.

Thus, after the February 26 Incident, the Kōdōha effectively ceased to exist, and the Tōseiha lost most of its raison d'être. Although Tōseiha followers gained control of the army, the Kōdōha ideals of spiritual power and imperial mysticism remained embedded in the army, as did its tradition of insubordination of junior officers (gekokujō), and resurfaced with the outbreak of the Second Sino-Japanese War in 1937.

See also
 Hakkō ichiu

References

Imperial Japanese Army
Politics of the Empire of Japan
Shōwa Statism
Far-right politics in Japan
Fascism in Japan
Japanese militarism